Syzygium minus is a species of plant in the family Myrtaceae. It is endemic to Fiji.

References

Endemic flora of Fiji
minus
Endangered plants
Taxonomy articles created by Polbot